Richard Goodwin may refer to:

Richard Goodwin (minister) (died 1685), British minister
Richard Goodwin (sportsman), Australian-Filipino cricketer, Rugby League player and Rugby Sevens player
Richard Goodwin (producer) (born 1934), British film producer
Richard Elton Goodwin (1908–1986), British general
Richard H. Goodwin (1910–2007), American botanist and conservationist
Richard J. Goodwin (born 1953), Australian artist, architect and professor
Richard M. Goodwin (1913–1996), American mathematician and economist
Richard N. Goodwin (1931–2018), American writer and advisor to US Presidents Kennedy and Johnson

See also
Richard Godwin (1922–2005), American nuclear engineer and Reagan Administration under secretary
Richard Godwyn (died 1601), English MP